The Wedding of Lilli Marlene is a 1953 British drama film directed by Arthur Crabtree and starring Lisa Daniely, Hugh McDermott and Sid James. It was made at Southall Studios with sets designed by the art director Ray Simm. It was produced as a as a sequel to the 1950 film Lilli Marlene.

Premise
After the end of the Second World War, Lilli Marlene and American reporter Steve Moray plan to marry, but when Lilli gets a chance for a big break on the London stage, it throws their plans into disarray.

Cast
 Lisa Daniely as Lilli Marlene 
 Hugh McDermott as Steve Moray, Lilli's fiancé
 Sid James as Finnimore Hunt 
 Gabrielle Brune as Maggie Lennox 
 Jack Billings as Hal Marvel 
 Robert Ayres as Andrew Jackson 
 Joan Heal as Linda 
 John Blythe as Holt
 Mairhi Russell as 	Mrs. Smith
 Irene Handl as Rosie, the Eastern European dresser 
 Wally Patch as Wally 
 Dandy Nichols as 	Mrs. Harris 
 Ann Bennett as Forbes
 Ben Williams as 	Ted
 Tom Gill as	Willy
 Jacques Cey as Vittorio
 Ernst Ulman as Salmon
 Jacqueline Mackenzie as 	Theatre Barmaid
 Charmian Buchel as Becky
 George Roderick as 	Theatrical Agen
 Stanley Baker as 	Audience Member

References

Bibliography
 McFarlane, Brian . Four from the forties: Arliss, Crabtree, Knowles and Huntington. Manchester University Press, 2018.

External links

1953 films
1953 drama films
Films directed by Arthur Crabtree
Films shot at Southall Studios
British drama films
British sequel films
British black-and-white films
Films set in London
1950s English-language films
1950s British films